The Führer Grenadier Brigade (formerly Führer Grenadier Battalion later Führer Grenadier Division) was an élite German Army combat unit which saw action during World War II. The Führer Grenadier Brigade is sometimes mistakenly perceived as being a part of the Waffen-SS, whereas it was actually an Army unit and technically assigned to the Großdeutschland Division. This misconception comes from its original duty of guarding Adolf Hitler's East Prussian Wolfsschanze Headquarters, a task which sounded similar to the original one of Waffen-SS 1. Panzer Division "Leibstandarte SS Adolf Hitler", which in turn stemmed from the Führer's original bodyguard corps. Fighting on both the Eastern and Western Fronts, the brigade surrendered to U.S. forces in Austria in 1945.

Creation and Early History

The Führer Grenadier Battalion was raised in April, 1943 to act as a second guard unit on the outer perimeter of Hitler's Wolfsschanze in Rastenburg, East Prussia.

Despite the idea of Hitler's bodyguards being drawn from the SS, a small detachment was drawn from the Wach Regiment to become Hitler's private bodyguard. This unit was called the Führer Begleit (or Führer Escort), and was to eventually be expanded to divisional size (see Führer Begleit Brigade).

Brigade - Eastern Front

In 1944, the battalion was reorganized as an armored brigade at Fallingbostel. Personnel were drawn from the Großdeutschland Division pool of hand-picked personnel. In October 1944, it was assigned to XXVII Korps of the Fourth Army and sent to the vicinity of Gumbinnen. They fought at Daken and Grosswaltersdorf from October 21–23. The brigade operated in conjunction with 5th Panzer Division and the Hermann Göring Division.

Western Front - Wacht am Rhein
Between December 11–17, 1944, the brigade was sent west to participate in Operation Herbstnebel.
The brigade's composition did not match any standard unit configuration. The Großdeutschland Division never fought on the western front in 1944–45 (it did see action in the 1940 campaign). As a part of Großdeutschland, FGB was permitted to wear cuff-title insignia. The Großdeutschland was ordered to wear the cuff title on the right sleeve (as did veterans of the North African campaign or the taking of Crete with their own honour bands), while the SS wore theirs on the left. In 1945, the brigade was awarded their own cuff title, FGB.
FGB was assigned to Seventh Army Reserve for Operation Herbstnebel.

Division - 1945
The brigade was pulled from battle in early January. On paper, it was enlarged to a division and assigned to Heeresgruppe Vistula. In April, it was reassigned to 6th Panzer Army.
The Führer Grenadier Division surrendered to U.S. troops in May 1945 near Vienna, Austria.

Commanders

Holders of the Knight's Cross of the Iron Cross

Generalmajor Hellmuth Mäder, awarded Swords to his Knight's Cross on April 18, 1945 as Commander of the Führer Grenadier Division.

101 Panzer Regiment
Hauptmann Herbert Hensel, Knight's Cross on March 5, 1945 as Commander of the II. Abteilung (Panzer-Füsilier-Bataillon)/Panzer-Regiment 101 (former I./PzGrenRegt 99).

99 Panzergrenadier Regiment
Major Ernst-Günter Lehnhoff, Knight's Cross on December 12, 1944 as Commander of the Panzer-Füsilier-Bataillon of the Führer-Grenadier-Brigade (I./PzGrenRegt 99).

Order of battle

 101 Panzer Regiment
 1 Companie - 12 Panthers
 2 Companie - 12 Panthers
 3 Companie - 12 Panthers
 4 Companie - 11 Jagdpanthers with 88mm Pak 43
 5 Companie - 14 Stug III
99 Panzergrenadier Regiment - 92 Armored Personnel Carriers
 Artillerie Regiment 'FGB'(-) - 12 - 150mm guns (10 guns on loan to Skorzeny's Panzer Brigade 150 during Herbstnebel)
 911 Sturmgeschutz Brigade
 1 Companie - 10 Stug III
 2 Companie - 14 Stug III
 3 Companie -  6 Stug III
 124 Flak Abteilung
 Kampfschule 'FGB'
 1124 Infantriegeschutz Kompanie
 1124 Panzerjäger Kompanie - 3 Marder III, 4 Jagdpanthers, 6 Hetzer
 1124 Panzer Aufklärungs Kompanie
 1124 Flak Kompanie - 26 guns
 1124 Pionier Kompanie
 1124 Nachrichten Abteilung
 Nachschub Truppe 'FGB'
 Werkstatt Kompanie 'FGB'
 Sanitäts Kompanie 'FGB'

See also
List of German divisions in World War II

Bibliography

Printed references
 

Brigades of the German Army in World War II
Armoured brigades of the German Army in World War II
Military units and formations established in 1943
Military units and formations disestablished in 1945

it:Divisione Grossdeutschland
fi:Großdeutschland-divisioona